Miquel Pons Payeras (born 1 August 1997) is a Spanish motorcycle racer. He currently competes in the MotoE World Cup.

Career statistics

Supersport World Championship

Races by year
(key) (Races in bold indicate pole position; races in italics indicate fastest lap)

Career statistics

FIM Moto2 European Championship

Races by year
(key) (Races in bold indicate pole position) (Races in italics indicate fastest lap)

Grand Prix motorcycle racing

By season

By class

Races by year
(key) (Races in bold indicate pole position; races in italics indicate fastest lap)

References

External links

1997 births
Living people
Sportspeople from Palma de Mallorca
Spanish motorcycle racers
Moto2 World Championship riders
MotoE World Cup riders
Supersport World Championship riders